Nallari Kiran Kumar Reddy (born 13 September 1959) is an Indian politician who served as the 16th Chief Minister of Andhra Pradesh between 25 November 2010 and 1 March 2014. He was the last Chief Minister of the United Andhra Pradesh before the formation of the Telangana state on 2 June 2014.

Reddy was sworn in as the 16th Chief Minister of Andhra Pradesh on 25 November 2010. A four-time Member of the Legislative Assembly in Andhra Pradesh, he was a leader of the Indian National Congress party before resigning from it in February 2014 over the creation of Telangana state. Concurrently Reddy also submitted his resignation from the chief ministership to Governor E. S. L. Narasimhan; the latter accepted the resignation, but asked Reddy to continue as caretaker chief minister. President's Rule was imposed in the state on 1 March 2014. On 10 March 2014 he floated his new political outfit called Jai Samaikyandhra Party. In elections the party failed to win a single seat and lost deposits in numerous seats. The party dissolved on 13 July 2018 and Reddy re-joined INC.

Early life 
Kiran Kumar Reddy is a member of the Indian National Congress party and his father, Amaranath Reddy, was a minister in P. V. Narasimha Rao's cabinet. His family hails from Nagaripalle, near Kalikiri, in Chittoor, Annamayya district. He did his schooling from Hyderabad Public School and intermediate from St. Joseph's Junior College, Hyderabad. He did his B.Com. from Nizam College and LL.B. from University College of Law, Osmania University. He was an avid cricketer in college. He was batch mates with Nandamuri Balakrishna and former Indian Cricket team captain, Mohammad Azharuddin, who also represented Hyderabad in the Ranji trophy.
He also captained the Hyderabad under-22 , South Zone Universities and Osmania University cricket teams. He also attended Besant Theosophical High School in Chennai for some years.

Political career 
Reddy was elected to Andhra Pradesh Legislative Assembly in 1989 after his father's death. He served as member of the Public Undertakings Committee and Assurance Committee. He was elected to the state assembly from Native Vayalpadu (Valmikipuram) in 1989, 1999 and 2004. He lost in 1994 when Congress was routed in Chittoor district. He won from Pileru in 2009 after Valmikipuram got merged into Pileru constituency under delimitation.  A known YSR loyalist, he was the Congress government chief whip for five years from 2004, before he was made the speaker. On 10 March 2014 he announced the formation of Jai Samaikyandhra Party with Chundru Srihari Rao as its Founder-President.

He has re-joined the Congress party in July 2018 in the presence of AICC Chief Rahul Gandhi.

As Speaker 
Reddy was unanimously elected as Speaker of the 13th Andhra Pradesh Assembly in June 2009. His name for the speaker's post was proposed by erstwhile chief minister YS Rajasekhara Reddy, AIMIM floor leader Akbaruddin Owaisi, Agriculture minister N. Raghuveera Reddy and two other independents.

As Chief Minister 
Reddy was made to be the new Chief Minister of Andhra Pradesh after incumbent K Rosaiah resigned citing personal reasons, by the Congress Legislature Party and authorised party in 2011. On 19 February 2014, he resigned from the post of Chief Minister, as MLA (legislator) and also from the Congress party, after the Telangana bill was passed in Lok Sabha.

Welfare programmes 
Reddy is credited with launching schemes such as Mee Seva, Rajiv Yuva Kiranalu, SC/ST Sub-Plan, Bangaru Thalli, Mana Biyyam, Amma Hastham, and the Chittor water scheme.

Jai Samaikyandhra Party 
On 11 March 2014, Reddy wanted to launch a new political party in order to survive in the state and named as Jai Samaikyandhra Party, by opposing the centre's decision on bifurcation of the Andhra Pradesh state. He formally launched the party in Rajahmundry on 12 March 2014. Finally, Reddy dissolved it and re-joined INC on 13 July 2018.

See also 
 List of Chief Ministers of Andhra Pradesh

References 

1959 births
Chief ministers from Indian National Congress
Chief Ministers of Andhra Pradesh
Indian National Congress politicians from Andhra Pradesh
Living people
Osmania University alumni
People from Chittoor district
People from Rayalaseema
Speakers of the Andhra Pradesh Legislative Assembly
Telangana politicians
Telugu politicians